Pletsch is a surname. Notable people with the surname include:

 Charles Pletsch (1893–1950), Canadian hockey player
 Fred Pletsch, Canadian-American hockey analyst
 Marcelo Pletsch (born 1976), Brazilian footballer

See also
 Pletch